Lawrenceton is an unincorporated community located in the southern part of Jackson Township in Sainte Genevieve County, Missouri, United States. The town lies 14 miles to the west of Ste. Genevieve.

Etymology
Lawrenceton was named after Henry Lawrence, a businessman who had contributed in the development of the settlement. Henry Lawrence had a flour mill, a farm, and a store, from which mail was delivered. The original name of the settlement was Punjaub, similar in name to the district in India, although there is no explanation for its origin. Some people have tried to explain the name as a corruption of pond job because of a dam built at that location for a water-powered mill.

References 

Unincorporated communities in Ste. Genevieve County, Missouri
Unincorporated communities in Missouri